Lord Charles Pelham Pelham-Clinton (3 December 1813 – 15 December 1894), known as Lord Charles Clinton, was a British Conservative politician.

Background
Clinton was a younger son of Henry Pelham-Clinton, 4th Duke of Newcastle, and Georgiana Elizabeth, daughter of Edward Miller-Mundy. Henry Pelham-Clinton, 5th Duke of Newcastle was his elder brother and Lord Robert Pelham-Clinton his younger brother.

Political career
Clinton sat as Member of Parliament for Sandwich between 1852 and 1857.

Family
Clinton married Elizabeth, daughter of William Grant, in 1848. They had several children. He died in December 1894, aged 81. His wife survived him by five years and died in November 1899.

References

External links 
 

1813 births
1894 deaths
Younger sons of dukes
Conservative Party (UK) MPs for English constituencies
UK MPs 1852–1857
Charles
Place of birth missing